We're No Monks is a 2004 Tibetan drama film, directed and written by Pema Dhondup (his first feature film as a director). The film is produced by Pema Dhondup, Rupin Dang, and Yangchen Dolkar under the banner of Clear Mirror Pictures, and Wilderness Films India Limited. The film stars Tsering Dorjee, Gulshan Grover, and Sonam Phuntsok in the lead roles.

Plot 
Four friends in Dharamsala go on a religious mission but their true selves are eventually revealed.

Cast 

 Tsering Dorjee as Pasanag
 Gulshan Grover as Shamsher Singh
 Sonam Phuntsok as Tsering

References

External links 

 
 

2004 films
Tibetan-language films
Films directed by Pema Dhondup